This list covers famous or notable people or groups who were born or raised in Glasgow, Scotland or have been connected with it.

Arts

Architecture
David Hamilton – architect
Charles Rennie Mackintosh – architect and designer
Alexander "Greek" Thomson – architect

Film
Bill Forsyth – film director
May Miles Thomas – screenwriter, filmmaker

Journalism
Lawrence Donegan – journalist
Johann Hari – journalist
Jack House – journalist, writer and broadcaster
Andrew Marr – journalist, writer and television presenter
Jack Webster – journalist

Literature
Freddie Anderson – socialist playwright and poet originally from Ireland
James Bridie – playwright
Catherine Carswell – novelist and biographer of the Scottish renaissance
A. J. Cronin – doctor and novelist
Ivor Cutler – poet, songwriter, humourist
Lavinia Derwent – children's writer
Alasdair Gray – artist, novelist and essayist
Pearse Hutchinson – poet
James Kelman – novelist
Tom Leonard – poet
Liz Lochhead – poet and playwright
Peter May – crime writer
Edwin Morgan – poet and translator
Grant Morrison – comic book author
Tony Roper – actor, television writer, author
Suhayl Saadi – physician, novelist, playwright, anthologist; co-editor of A Fictional Guide to Scotland
J David Simons – author
Alan Spence – novelist and poet
Nigel Tranter – historical novelist

Performing arts
John Barrowman – singer and actor (The Producers, Torchwood)
Sean Biggerstaff – actor (Harry Potter)
Billy Boyd – actor (The Lord of the Rings)
Frankie Boyle – comedian
Kevin Bridges – comedian
Peter Capaldi – actor (The Thick of It, In The Loop, Doctor Who)
Robert Carlyle – actor (Trainspotting, The World Is Not Enough)
Lawrence Chaney – drag queen and winner of the second series of RuPaul's Drag Race UK
Morven Christie – actress
Robbie Coltrane – actor (Harry Potter, Cracker)
Billy Connolly – comedian (The Man Who Sued God)
Kate Copstick – actress and director
Tony Curran – actor
Iain De Caestecker – actor (The Fades, Young James Herriot, Agents of S.H.I.E.L.D.)
Craig Ferguson – actor and writer
Gregor Fisher – comedian
Laura Fraser – actress
Rikki Fulton – comedian
Michelle Gomez – actress (Doctor Who, Green Wing)
Greg Hemphill – actor
Olaf Hytten – actor
Ford Kiernan – actor
Gary Lewis – actor
Brian Limond – comedian and actor
Marie Loftus – music hall entertainer
Kelly Macdonald – actress (Trainspotting, Boardwalk Empire)
Angus Macfadyen – actor
Freya Mavor – actress (Skins)
James McAvoy – actor
David McCallum – actor, first noted for playing secret agent Illya Kuryakin
Rory McCann – actor
Jane McCarry – actress
Joe McFadden – actor (Holby City, Heartbeat)
Graham McTavish – actor
David O'Hara – actor
Daniel Portman – actor
Richard Rankin – actor
Maurice Roëves – actor
Jerry Sadowitz – comedian
John Gordon Sinclair – actor
Dawn Steele – actress
Brian Vernel – actor
Susan Calman – comedian and actor
Jonathan Watson – actor

Visual arts
Jacqueline Donachie – artist
Hannah Frank – artist and sculptor
John Glashan – cartoonist
Bud Neill – cartoonist (Lobey Dosser)
Cordelia Oliver – artist, writer and art critic
Frank Quitely – comic book artist

Business
William Beardmore – Beardmores, Parkhead Forge, Arrol-Johnston motor company
George Bogle of Daldowie – wealthy tobacco merchant
Sir William Burrell – shipping magnate and philanthropist
William Cunninghame – tobacco merchant
John Glassford – wealthy tobacco merchant, partner in Thistle Bank
Sir Thomas Lipton – entrepreneur, Lipton Tea
Norman Macfarlane, Baron Macfarlane of Bearsden – entrepreneur
James McGill – businessman and philanthropist
Robert Napier – co-founder of Cunard Line
Reo Stakis – entrepreneur
Charles Tennant – St. Rollox Chemicals Works

Civic

Founder
Saint Mungo – traditional founder of the city

Campaigners
Mary Barbour
Ian Dunn, gay and paedophile rights activist

Crime and punishment
Ian Brady – violent criminal
Archibald Hall – murderer
Allan Pinkerton – detective
Edward William Pritchard – murderer who was publicly executed in Glasgow and was the last person to be publicly executed in Scotland

Law
Madge Easton Anderson, lawyer

Provosts

George Elphinstone (died 1634) – Lord Provost and courtier

Education
Mary Ellen Bews, New Zealand school principal and educationalist, born in Glasgow

Humanities
David Stow Adam, theologian
C. A. Campbell – metaphysical philosopher
William Purdie Dickson – scholar
Niall Ferguson – historian and writer
William MacAskill – philosopher and ethicist

Fictional figures
Scrooge McDuck – fictional multi-billionaire cartoon duck
Desmond Hume, fictional character in the TV series Lost.

Military
William Anderson – recipient of the Victoria Cross
Andrew Bogle – recipient of the Victoria Cross
Robert Downie – recipient of the Victoria Cross
Francis Farquharson – recipient of the Victoria Cross
Herbert Henderson – recipient of the Victoria Cross
John Knox – recipient of the Victoria Cross
Donald MacKintosh – recipient of the Victoria Cross
Henry May – recipient of the Victoria Cross
John McAulay – recipient of the Victoria Cross
John McDermond – recipient of the Victoria Cross
Hugh McInnes – recipient of the Victoria Cross
James Miller – recipient of the Victoria Cross
Sir John Moore – British military officer
James Park – recipient of the Victoria Cross
Harry Ranken – recipient of the Victoria Cross
William Reid – recipient of the Victoria Cross
Walter Ritchie – recipient of the Victoria Cross
George Rodgers – recipient of the Victoria Cross
John Skinner – recipient of the Victoria Cross
James Stokes – recipient of the Victoria Cross
James Turnbull – recipient of the Victoria Cross
William Young – recipient of the Victoria Cross

Musicians and bands

Bands

Belle & Sebastian
Bis
The Blue Nile
Camera Obscura
Chvrches
Deacon Blue
Del Amitri
The Delgados
El Presidente
Franz Ferdinand
The Fratellis
Glasvegas
Hipsway
Love and Money
Makethisrelate
The Marmalade
Mogwai
Mother and the Addicts
Optimo
Orange Juice
The Pastels
Primal Scream
Sensational Alex Harvey Band
The Silencers
Simple Minds
Sons and Daughters
The Supernaturals
Teenage Fanclub
Texas
Travis
Twin Atlantic
Wet Wet Wet

Musicians
Jimmy Barnes, Australian singer
Maggie Bell, singer
Jack Bruce, musician
Darius Campbell Danesh, singer-songwriter
Junior Campbell, musician
Lewis Capaldi, singer-songwriter and musician
Gerry Cinnamon, singer-songwriter
Jimmy Dewar (from Robin Trower band)
Jim Diamond
Lonnie Donegan
Donovan
Joe Egan
Bobby Gillespie, singer-songwriter
Clare Grogan – singer and actress
Fran Healy
Michael Hunter – music games composer
Mark Knopfler
Oliver Knussen – composer and conductor
Jeanie Lambe – jazz singer
Frederic Lamond – classical pianist and pupil of Franz Liszt
Mary Lee – singer
Lulu
Amy Macdonald
Helen Marnie – singer, Ladytron
John Martyn
David McCallum, Sr. – concertmaster violinist; father of David McCallum
Matt McGinn – folk musician, writer and entertainer.
Lisa McHugh
Frankie Miller
Hudson Mohawke, producer, composer and DJ
Paolo Nutini
Emma Pollock – Indie rock singer-songwriter, composer, musician and a founding member of the band The Delgados
Gerry Rafferty
Chris Rainbow
Eddi Reader
Maggie Reilly
Rustie
David Sneddon
Jimmy Somerville – singer
Sharleen Spiteri – singer, songwriter and guitarist
Al Stewart – singer-songwriter and folk-rock musician
John Swan
Dougie Thomson
Midge Ure
Eric Woolfson
Sophie – musician and DJ
Angus Young – Scottish-born Australian guitarist (AC/DC)
George Young – Scottish-born Australian guitarist (The Easybeats)
John Paul Young, Australian singer
Malcolm Young – Scottish-born Australian guitarist (AC/DC)

Politics
Bashir Ahmad – first Asian MSP
William Aitchison – mayor of Invercargill
Jamesina Anderson
James Sibree Anderson – member of the Wisconsin State Assembly
Mhairi Black – youngest ever Member of Parliament (MP) elected to the House of Commons of the United Kingdom since at least the Reform Act of 1832
Gordon Brown – British prime minister
Sir Menzies Campbell – former Leader of the Liberal Democrats
Sir Henry Campbell-Bannerman – British prime minister
Roseanna Cunningham – Scottish National Party MP, MSP
Donald Dewar – Secretary of State for Scotland, First Minister
Pearse Doherty – Sinn Féin politician
Winnie Ewing – Scottish National Party MP, MEP and MSP
Margaret Ferrier – Scottish National Party MP
George Galloway – former Labour (later Respect) MP for Glasgow Hillhead (1987–97) and Glasgow Kelvin (1997–2005)
Nigel Griffiths – Labour Member of Parliament for Edinburgh South
James Keir Hardie – co-founder and Chairman of the Scottish Labour Party
Arthur Henderson – Chairman of the Labour Party
Bonar Law – British prime minister
John MacCormick – Scottish National Party
Sir John A. Macdonald – first Prime Minister of Canada
John Maclean – Socialist
Michael Martin – Speaker of the House of Commons
James Maxton – Independent Labour Party MP
Tommy Sheridan – Scottish Socialist Party MSP
Manny Shinwell – Labour MP
Nicola Sturgeon – Scottish First Minister and leader of the Scottish National Party

Sports

Tennis
Andy Murray Olympic and professional tennis player

Cycling
Philippa York – cyclist

Snooker
Marcus Campbell – professional snooker player
Stephen Maguire – professional snooker player
Anthony McGill – professional snooker player
Alan McManus – professional snooker player

Baseball
Mac MacArthur – Major League Baseball player
Jim McCormick – baseball player
Bobby Thomson – baseball player

Boxing
Scott Harrison – boxer
Benny Lynch – boxer
Jim Watt – boxer

Football
 

Jen Beattie - footballer
Tom Boyd – footballer
Jim Craig – footballer
Graeme Churchill – footballer
Pat Crerand – footballer
Sir Kenny Dalglish – former football player and manager
Tommy Docherty – football manager
Sir Alex Ferguson – former Manchester United manager
Alexander Watson Hutton – "Father of Argentine football"
Mo Johnston – footballer
Paul Mackie – footballer
Ross McCormack – footballer
James McFadden – footballer
Frank McGarvey – footballer
Aiden McGeady – footballer
Danny McGrain – footballer and manager
Jimmy McGrory - footballer and manager 
Bobby Murdoch – footballer
Andrew Robertson – footballer
Peter Sermanni – Scottish former professional footballer
Robert Snodgrass – footballer
Jock Stein – football manager
David Templeton – footballer
John Wark – international footballer
Gordon Wilson - retired footballer

Golf
Martin Laird – golfer
Colin Montgomerie – golfer

Ice hockey
Andy Aitkenhead
Scott Campbell
Gordie Clark
James Foster (ice hockey)
Alex Gray (ice hockey) 
Frank Jardine (ice hockey)
Matthew Rich
Jim Sherrit
Colin Shields
Steve Smith (ice hockey, born in Scotland)

Rugby union
Adam Ashe
Johnnie Beattie
Magnus Bradbury
Alan Bulloch
Gordon Bulloch
Thomas Chalmers
Scott Cummings
James Eddie
Jonny Gray
Richie Gray
Rory Hughes
Alastair Kellock
James Malcolm
Euan Murray
Max Simmers
Duncan Weir
Jon Welsh

Cricket
James Stewart Carrick (1855–1923) – holder of the world record for the highest score
William Foster (born 1934) – first-class cricketer
David Livingstone (1927–2011) – international cricketer for Scotland

Professional wrestling
Nikki Cross
Joe Coffey
Mark Coffey
Wolfgang
Isla Dawn

Swimming
Michael Jamieson
Duncan Scott

Science and engineering
June Almeida – virologist
Joseph Black – physicist and chemist
Phillip Clancey – ornithologist
Thomas Hopkirk – botanist
Ronald David Laing – psychiatrist
Joseph Lister – surgeon
Elizabeth Janet MacGregor – medical doctor
Ailsa McKay – economist
David Napier – marine engineer
Robert Napier – marine engineer, co-founder of Cunard Line
James Beaumont Neilson – inventor
Sir William Ramsay – chemist
E.S. Russell – zoologist
William Thomson, Lord Kelvin – mathematician, mathematical physicist and engineer 
James Watt – engineer
Nora Wattie – public health pioneer
John Scott Russell – naval engineer
Charles Macintosh – inventor
William Wright Virtue – engineer

See also
List of Provosts and Lord Provosts of Glasgow
List of bands from Glasgow

References

 
Glaswegians
Gla
Glaswegians